Zabrus canaricus is a species of ground beetle in the Macarozabrus subgenus that is endemic to the Canary Islands.

References

Beetles described in 1992
Endemic fauna of the Canary Islands
Zabrus